Palatini may refer to:

 Michele Palatini (1855-1914), Italian politician
 Attilio Palatini (1889–1949), Italian mathematician
 Palatini identity
 Palatini variation
 Latin plural of Palatine
 Palatini (Roman military), elite regiments, literally "Palace troops"